Glenn Claes (born 8 March 1994) is a Belgian professional footballer who plays as a midfielder for RWDM in the Belgian First Division B.

Professional career
Born in Lier, Claes started playing football at Lyra at an early age, until the local professional club, Lierse, scouted him to their academy.

On 18 March 2012, Claes made his senior debut for the club when he was in the starting lineup against Mons, before being substituted in the 77th minute in the 1–1 draw.

In 2013, he signed with Mechelen. In the 2014–15 and 2015–16 seasons, he made more than 30 league appearances. Prior to the 2018–19 season, Claes was sent to Lommel on loan. After this loan, Claes signed a two-year contract with Virton on a free transfer.

In September 2020, it was announced that Claes had signed a two-year contract with RWDM in the Belgian First Division B.

Personal life
Claes is the son of the Belgian former Lyra and Lierse goalkeeper Eddy Claes.

References

External links
 
 

1994 births
Living people
Belgian footballers
Belgium youth international footballers
Lierse S.K. players
K.V. Mechelen players
Lommel S.K. players
R.E. Virton players
RWDM47 players
Belgian Pro League players
Challenger Pro League players
Association football defenders
People from Lier, Belgium
Footballers from Antwerp Province